Anna Dickson Ishaku (née Mbasughun; born 24 August 1957) is the founder and CEO of the NGO "Hope Afresh Foundation Taraba" and a member of the Nigerian Bar Association. She is married to Darius Dickson Ishaku, the Governor of Taraba State.

Early life and education
Mbasughun was born on 24 August 1957 in Wusasa, Zaria but hails from Vandeikya Local Government Area of Benue State. She attended the St. Bartholomew's Primary School, Wusasa, Zaria (1964-1969); where she further proceeded to Girls High School Gindiri (1969-1973). She was enrolled into the School of Basic Studies, Ahmadu Bello University from 1975 to 1976 and she graduated with Law Degree in 1979. She further attended Nigerian Law School, Lagos in 1979 and was called to the Nigerian Bar in 1980.

Charity and philanthropy
Mbasughun founded the Non Governmental Organization "Hope Afresh Foundation Taraba" on 7 July 2016. Its vision is to become a global key player in providing humanitarian services.

On March 22, 2017, the foundation announced it partnership with the Central Bank of Nigeria to train unemployed youths. The CBN Entrepreneurship Development Training has been in existence for over two years in the North-East zone of Nigeria but failed to have Tarabans participating in the training until the intervention of Hope Afresh Foundation.

Another project is the Hope Health Center (HHC), a rehabilitation center which is committed to the improvements of lives to the citizens of Taraba, living with the effects of substance abuse and lessening the adverse impact on families and societies as a whole. She is also a strong advocate for Women in power, politics and peace.

Personal life
Mbasughun is married to Darius Dickson Ishaku, the Governor of Taraba State and they have five children.

See also 

 List of first ladies of Nigerian states

References

Living people
20th-century Nigerian lawyers
People from Taraba State
Nigerian women in politics
Nigerian philanthropists
Women chief executives
Nigerian chief executives
Nigerian women lawyers
1957 births
Ahmadu Bello University alumni